Dolly Parton is an American country singer, songwriter and actress. She has appeared in twelve theatrically released films and has made over 400 appearances on television.

Parton's first televised appearance was in 1956 on the Cas Walker Farm and Home Hour when she was 10 years old; she had previously appeared on Cas Walker's radio show. Her major television breakthrough came in 1967 when she was discovered by Porter Wagoner who had her join his weekly variety show, The Porter Wagoner Show. Parton appeared on 218 episodes of the show between 1967 and 1975 as a regular performer. Appearing on the show with Wagoner during this time is credited with helping to boost Parton to superstardom.

Following her departure from Wagoner's weekly show, Parton transitioned into a more pop-oriented musical style in 1976 and 1977. During this time Parton starred in her own variety show Dolly!, which ran for one season. Parton's popularity exploded following a string of appearances on The Tonight Show with Johnny Carson beginning in 1977, and she went on to be prominently featured in numerous television specials, including ones headlined by Mac Davis and Cher, with whom she shared manager Sandy Gallin.

In 1980 Parton made her theatrical film debut as Doralee Rhodes in 9 to 5. She wrote the film's theme song, which was nominated for an Academy Award and a Grammy. In 1982 Parton appeared in The Best Little Whorehouse in Texas as Mona Stangley. She contributed two additional songs to the film's score, "Sneakin' Around" and "I Will Always Love You". The film and Parton herself were nominated for Golden Globes for Best Motion Picture (Comedy or Musical) and Best Actress in a Motion Picture (Comedy or Musical), respectively. In 1984 Parton starred in Rhinestone with Sylvester Stallone. The film was panned upon its release, and is generally regarded as a commercial and critical flop. However, the soundtrack yielded two top 10 hits for Parton, "Tennessee Homesick Blues" and "God Won't Get You".

Parton starred in the Christmas television special Kenny & Dolly: A Christmas to Remember  with Kenny Rogers in 1984 to promote their collaborative Christmas album Once Upon a Christmas. In 1986 Parton starred in the made-for-television film A Smoky Mountain Christmas. During the 1987–1988 television season, Parton attempted a second variety show on ABC, also titled Dolly. Like the previous series, this one also only lasted one season.

Parton starred in the 1989 film Steel Magnolias with Sally Field, Shirley MacLaine and Julia Roberts.

In 1991 Parton starred in the made-for-television film Wild Texas Wind.

Parton returned to the silver screen in 1992 with James Woods in the 1992 film Straight Talk. The film received mixed reviews, with most of the praise going to Parton and Woods' performances, while criticizing the storyline. In 1993 she made a cameo appearance in The Beverly Hillbillies.

In 1994 Parton starred in two pilot episodes for sitcoms, Heavens to Betsy, and Mindin' My Own Business, neither of which were ordered to series. Parton starred in the made-for-television films Unlikely Angel in 1996 and Blue Valley Songbird in 1999.

In the 2000s Parton made appearances in the films Frank McKlusky, C.I. and Miss Congeniality 2: Armed and Fabulous as well as television appearances on Reba and Hannah Montana.

Parton starred in the 2012 film Joyful Noise with Queen Latifah, Keke Palmer and Jeremy Jordan. She also made cameo appearances in The Year Dolly Parton Was My Mom in 2011 and Hollywood to Dollywood in 2012.

In 2015 Parton and NBC produced the made-for-television film Dolly Parton's Coat of Many Colors featuring Parton as narrator. A sequel, Dolly Parton's Christmas of Many Colors: Circle of Love was produced in 2016, again featuring Parton as narrator and in a cameo appearance as the Painted Lady who inspired her signature style.

Parton and Netflix partnered together to produce a series of television films based on Parton's songs, titled Dolly Parton's Heartstrings. It was released in 2019.

Film

Television

References

Actress filmographies
Filmography
American filmographies